Metsaküla may refer to several places in Estonia:

Metsaküla, Hiiu County, village in Hiiumaa Parish, Hiiu County
Metsaküla, Järva County, village in Türi Parish, Järva County
Metsaküla, Jõgeva County, village in Mustvee Parish, Jõgeva County
Metsaküla, Lääne County, village in Haapsalu City, Lääne County
Metsaküla, Häädemeeste Parish, village in Häädemeeste Parish, Pärnu County
Metsaküla, Põhja-Pärnumaa Parish, village in Põhja-Pärnumaa Parish, Pärnu County
Metsaküla, Saaremaa Parish, village in Saaremaa Parish, Saare County
Metsaküla, Viljandi County, village in Mulgi Parish, Viljandi County

Kõruse-Metsaküla (formerly Metsaküla), village in Saaremaa Parish, Saare County
Lussu (formerly Metsaküla), village in Saaremaa Parish, Saare County

See also
Metsküla (disambiguation)